The Central West LHIN is one of fourteen Local Health Integration Networks (LHINs) in the Canadian province of Ontario.

The Central West Local Health Integration Network is a community-based, non-profit organization funded by the Government of Ontario through the Ministry of Health and Long-Term Care.

Services
Central West LHIN plans, funds and coordinates the following operational public health care services to a population of approximately 800,000 people:

 Hospitals
 Etobicoke General Hospital (Etobicoke, ON)
 Brampton Civic Hospital (Brampton, ON)
 Peel Memorial Hospital (Brampton, ON)
 Orangeville Hospital (Orangeville, ON)
 Shelburne District Hospital (Shelburne, ON)
 Long-Term Care Homes
 Community Care Access Centre (CCAC)
 Community Support Service Agencies
 Mental Health and Addiction Agencies
 Community Health Centres (CHCs)

Geographic area
Central West LHIN services a region that includes all of Dufferin County and the northern section of the Regional Municipality of Peel.  This includes Rexdale, ON, Malton, ON, Brampton, ON, Orangeville, ON, Woodbridge, ON and Caledon, ON.

Budget
The Central West LHIN has an annual budget of approximately $734 million.

References

External links

Health regions of Ontario